Live from the Troubadour is the third live album by American country music singer Tanya Tucker. It was released on October 16, 2020, by Fantasy Records. The album was recorded on October 16, 2019, during the first night of Tucker's sold out two night engagement at the Troubadour to promote the release of While I'm Livin'.

Background
On July 8, 2019, Tucker announced three shows to celebrate the release of her new album, While I'm Livin'. The shows were August 22 at Nashville's Exit/In, September 17 at the Bowery Ballroom in New York, and October 16 at the Troubadour in Los Angeles. A second show at the Troubadour on October 17 was added on August 23. The first night at the Troubadour was recorded and highlights from the performance were broadcast by 88.5FM on December 13.

Release and promotion
The first single from the album, "Bring My Flowers Now", was released on December 13, 2019.

The album was announced on September 11, 2020. The second single, "I'm on Fire / Ring of Fire", was released the same day along with the album's pre-order.

Track listing

Personnel
Adapted from the album liner notes.

Performance
Tanya Tucker - vocals
Spencer Bartoletti – background vocals
Jake Clayton – utility (fiddle, dobro, steel, harmony vocals)
Andy Gibson – electric guitar
Jefferson Jarvis – keyboards
Shooter Jennings – keyboards on "High Ridin' Heroes"
Mike Malinin – drums
Brian Seligman – acoustic guitar
Presley Tucker – backing vocals
Dino Villanueva – bass guitar

Production
Paul Blakemore – mastering
Seth Presant – mixing
Cory Stone – recording
Tanya Tucker – producer

Other personnel
Derrick Kupish – photography
Carrie Smith – package design

References

2020 live albums
Tanya Tucker albums
Albums recorded at the Troubadour